is a Japanese  (romantic tale).

Authorship and date 
This means it may date from either the end of the Heian period or the beginning of the Kamakura period.

Reception 
 was highly regarded by thirteenth-century court audiences.

References

Works cited 

 

Japanese chronicles
Japanese culture